"Chase This Light" is the ninth track on Jimmy Eat World's sixth album, Chase This Light. It was never released as a single, but it did peak on the Pop 100, peaking at 99.

Reception

Virgin Media calls "Chase This Light", "heartfelt and uplifting", citing its melancholy.

Charts

Appearances in popular media

"Chase This Light" has been used on station promos for TNT.

References

2007 songs
Jimmy Eat World songs
Rock ballads